The Acteon Group (Groupe Actéon) is a rather isolated and uninhabited subgroup in the far southeast of the Tuamotu atoll group in French Polynesia.

Atolls
The Acteon Group includes four atolls of relatively small size:

Matureivavao
Tenararo
Tenarunga
Vahanga

None of the islands on these atolls have permanent inhabitants.

History
The first recorded European to sight the Acteon Group was Pedro Fernández de Quirós on 5 February 1605. He described the group as "four atolls crowned by coconut palms". On the different texts describing his voyage by other members of this Spanish expedition they were charted as "Las Cuatro Coronadas" (The four Crowned), "Las Cuatro Hermanas" (The Four Sisters), "Las Virgenes" (The Virgins) or "Las Anegadas" (The Flooded ones).

The rediscovery of Acteon Group is generally credited to Thomas Ebrill, captain of the Tahitian trading vessel Amphitrite, who discovered these islands in 1833. However, they were sighted by Hugh Cuming on his ship Discoverer, Captain Samuel Grimwood, on 14 March 1828 [Source: Cuming's log].

In January 1983 these atolls were struck by Severe Tropical Cyclone Nano.

In 1932 Tahiti's High Court recognised government ownership of the group, as well as the nearby atolls of Maria Est, Tematangi, and Vanavana. In 1953 the government established two civil real estate companies to develop the atolls for the benefit of their former inhabitants and granted them exclusive use for ten years. This period of exclusive use was later extended, and in 1975 and 1979 the atolls were permanently transferred. The companies were later dissolved, leaving the ownership of the atolls uncertain.

In March 2021 the Catholic Mission of Tahiti (CAMICA) claimed ownership of the seven atolls by right of occupation, leading to protests by the descendants of the original owners. The acquisition was later challenged in court; as of May 2022 the case is still unresolved.

Administration
Administratively the four atolls of the Acteon group belong to the commune of Gambier.

References

External links

Reefbase – Picture

Island Conservation: The Acteon and Gambier Restoration Project

Atolls of the Tuamotus
Island restoration